The Boin Tano Forest Reserve is a nature reserve located in the Western Region of Ghana. It was established in 1968.

Flora and fauna

Grasslands mixed with shrublands and forests dominate the reserve. Hundreds of different species live within this protected area and its boundaries.

Conservation status criteria

The following tags are used to highlight each species' conservation status as assessed by the IUCN.

See also
 List of amphibians of Ghana
 List of birds of Ghana
 List of butterflies of Ghana
 List of mammals of Ghana
 List of moths of Ghana
 List of national parks of Ghana
 List of reptiles of Ghana
 List of reptiles of Morocco

References

Sources

 
 

Eastern Guinean forests
Forest reserves of Ghana